Alabalık can refer to:

 Alabalık, Artvin
 Alabalık, Narman
 Alabalık, Posof